Kudungga (read: "Ku-ṇḍu-ṅga", honorific title: Maharaja Kudungga Anumerta Devavarman) was the founder of the Kutai Martadipura kingdom who ruled around the year 350 AD or 4th century AD. Kudungga first ruled the kingdom of Kutai Martadipura as a community leader or chieftain. Kutai Martadipura during Kudungga rule do not have a regular and systematical system of governance. In contrary, the latest claim is said that Maharaja Kudungga is possibly a king from ancient kingdom Bakulapura in Tebalrung (now Tebalai Indah, Muara Kaman), and Asvavarman which his son-in-law rather his son, then become the first king of Kutai Martadipura.

History 
The discovery of the most reliable source stating that Kutai Martadipura is the oldest kingdom in the nusantara archipelago is in yupa inscriptions. Seven pieces of yupa were found in Muara Kaman. According to the results of a study conducted by J.G. de Casparis (1949), yupa-yupa in Muara Kaman which allegedly a Kutai Martadipura civilization heritage were found successively in 1879 and 1940.

In yupa-yupa, there were inscriptions found written using Pallava script in Sanskrit language. Letters engraved on the yupa was thought to have come from the end of the 4th century or early 5th century AD. All of the monument stone was issued at the command of a leader named Maharaja Mulavarman Naladewa. Mulavarman is allegedly an Indianize name of the indigenous people because the name of his grandfather, namely Kudungga (there is also a mention kudunga or kundungga) is the original name of an indigenous Indonesian. Kudungga is what is believed to be the forerunner of the first leader of the kingdom of Kutai Martadipura, while Mulavarman is the successor Asvavarman (son of Kudungga) who brought the kingdom of Kutai Martadipura to their glory.

R.M. Ng. Poerbatjaraka (1952) interpret the circuit Pallava inscriptions in Sanskrit recorded on yupa about the genealogy of the kings who had ruled in the early days of the kingdom of Kutai Martadipura in translation:

Translation:

From the inscriptions of the heritage above, it can be concluded that the first king of Kutai Martadipura, is Kudungga. Kudungga had a son named Asvavarman who then passed the leadership in the kingdom of Kutai. Asvavarman had three children. Of the three children Aswawarman had, there was a child who was the most prominent, the child's name is Mulavarman who was the crown prince.

Ancestry

Name Origin 
The belief that Kudungga is indigenous Indonesian people based on the investigation that Kudungga clearly not Indian name, although the names of his descendants, Aswawarman and Mulawarman, containing elements of Indian name. In this case. Poesponegoro and Notosusanto (1993) states that there is a name that is similar to Bugis, namely Kadungga. The resemblance of this name is considered not just a coincidence given in South Sulawesi also found several inscriptions similar to what is found in Kutai.

Poesponegoro and Notosusanto (1993) further concluded that the most likely, both Kudungga who named his son Asvavarman and Asvavarman himself named his son Mulavarman, eager to equate their degree and their descendant align with the knight caste as in India. This possibility based on the fact that the word "varman" is derived from the Sanskrit word which is usually used to suffix the names of people in southern India. In the Hindu tradition that comes from India, the social system of society is divided into classes, known as levels where the warrior caste or aristocratic kingdom included in a respectable caste.

Latest Claim 
The latest claim came from newly reestablished Kutai Mulawarman Kingdom (direct descendant of Sultanate of Kutai Kartanagara) in Indonesia, Maharaja Kudungga is a king of Bakulapura in Tabalrung. Kudungga is son of King Atwangga and King Atwangga is son of Mitrongga, which is descendant of Emperor Pushyamitra Shunga from Shunga Empire in Magadha, India. During Kudungga rule, Shunga Empire no longer exist, and his successor Ashvavarman, use varman to state that his caste is kshatriya. These claims however are one-sided, and unsubstantiated with no historical records proving Atwangga and Mitrongga ever existed.

References 

History of Indonesia
Indonesian Hindu monarchs
Hindu monarchs
4th-century monarchs in Asia